Davis Doi (born 1957) is an American animation director and producer known for numerous American animated series and television films, as well as various Scooby-Doo and Care Bears video productions. He has been a part of many Hanna-Barbera and Cartoon Network original productions.

Career
He did assistant animation to Ralph Bakshi films, The Lord of the Rings and American Pop. He produced the Hanna-Barbera animated series SWAT Kats: The Radical Squadron. He co-produced with Larry Houston the second season of The Real Adventures of Jonny Quest. His work also includes Scooby-Doo on Zombie Island, The Smurfs and several other Hanna-Barbera animated cartoons.

Doi has received three Emmy Award nominations, one in 1994 for The Town Santa Forgot and two in 1998 for Cow and Chicken and Dexter's Laboratory. He was also nominated for a CableACE Award in 1996 for The Chicken from Outer Space, an animated short with the main characters from the eventual series Courage the Cowardly Dog.

Doi went on to work at SD Entertainment where he directed films and television.

Filmography

Films

Television

References

External links 

1957 births
Living people
American animators
American television producers
American television directors
American film directors
American film producers
American production designers
American animated film directors
American animated film producers
American storyboard artists
Hanna-Barbera people